Morgan Lake is a lake located in Waterford Township, Michigan. It borders Lake Angelus Rd. and is just east of Clintonville Rd.
 
The 28-acre lake is a private lake with two beaches for its residents. At its deepest point, the lake is 25 feet deep.

Namesake
Morgan Lake was named for Charles Morgan (1802-1875) who was an early settler on the shores of the lake that would later bear his family name.  Morgan settled in section 1 of Waterford Township on a 120-acre farm on the lake's southeast end.

Fish
Morgan Lake fish  include rainbow trout, brook trout and crappie

References

Lakes of Oakland County, Michigan
Lakes of Michigan
Lakes of Waterford Township, Michigan